Giovanni Maria Mosca or Giovanni Padovano (1495/99 – after 1573) was an Italian Renaissance sculptor and medallist, active between 1515 and 1573, initially in the Veneto and after 1529 in Poland, where his first name was rendered Jan.

Life
Born in Padua (which now has a street named after him), the first surviving mention of Mosca dates to 1507, when he began six years as apprentice to the Paduan sculptor Giovanni Minello and then to the goldsmith Bartolomeo Mantello. His first surviving work, The Beheading of Saint John the Baptist''' (1516; Padua Cathedral), dates to this period. His artistic training continued in the studio of Tullio Lombardo and Antonio Lombardo, both sons of the equally famous architect and sculptor Pietro Lombardo.

He was active in Veneto, where he produced important works in both Padua and Venice and collaborated with Guido Lizzaro, Bartolomeo di Francesco Bergamasco and Pietro Paolo Stella. He arrived in Kraków around 1529 after being summoned to Sigismund I's court. He had probably attracted by the commission for the royal tomb but probably arriving too late to contribute to that work, which was instead produced by the Florentine Bartolomeo Berrecci. His first commission in Poland was four medals showing the royal family. He gathered around himself the most important sculptural workshop in Poland, mainly specialising in tomb monuments.

Works
 The Beheading of Saint John the Baptist - 1516 - sacrestia dei Prebendati, Padua Cathedral
 Saint John the Baptist - sacristy, Santo Stefano, Venice
 Saint Roch, Saint John the Baptist, Saint Francis - 1520-22 - high altar, San Rocco, Venice
 Miracle of the Glass - 1520-29 - cappella del Santo, basilica di Sant'Antonio, Padua
 The Virgin of Charity - 1522 - Isabella Stewart Gardner Museum, Boston
 Judgement of Solomon - Louvre, Paris
 Altarpiece of the Sacrament - Santa Maria Mater Domini, Venice
 Cenotaph of Alvise Pasqualigo - 1523-29 - basilica di Santa Maria Gloriosa dei Frari, Venice
 Ecce Homo Altarpiece - 1524-25 - Casa Cardinal Piazza, Venice	
 Gateway - Sant'Agnese, Padua
 Porcia - 1523-29 - Galleria Franchetti alla Ca' d'Oro, Venice
 Philoctetes - 1520-29 - Palazzo Ducale, Mantua
 Eurydice - 1520-29 - Metropolitan Museum of Art, New York
 Eurydice - 1520-29 - Museo di Capodimonte, Naples
 Cleopatra - Musée des beaux-arts, Rennes
 Cleopatra - Museum Kunstpalast, Düsseldorf
 Mucius Scaevola - 1520-29 - Skulpturensammlung, Dresden
 Mucius Scaevola - 1520-29 - National Gallery of Scotland, Edinburgh
 Mucius Scaevola - 1520-29 - Museo del Bargello, Florence
 Mars/Achilles - 1520-29 - Bowes Museum, Barnard Castle
 Tomb of Archbishop Piotr Gamrat - 1545-47 - Wawel Cathedral, Kraków
 Ciborium, Wawel Cathedral, Kraków
 Arcade attic, Cloth Hall, Kraków

References

Bibliography
 Matteo Ceriana (ed.), I bassorilievi mitologi e sacri, in Il camerino di alabastro. Antonio Lombardo e la scultura all'antica, catalogo della mostra tenuta a Ferrara, Cinisello Balsamo, Silvana Editoriale, 2004, pp. 250–289, ISBN 8882157202.
 Beatrice Cirulli,  MOSCA, Giammaria, detto il Padovano, in Dizionario biografico degli italiani'', vol. 77, Roma, Istituto dell'Enciclopedia Italiana, 2012. URL consultato il 12 ottobre 2018.

External links

1490s births
16th-century deaths
Year of birth uncertain
Year of death unknown
People from Padua
Italian Renaissance sculptors
16th-century Italian sculptors
Italian medallists
16th-century medallists